Encounter (also known as Encounter!) is a first person shoot 'em up game released in 1983 for the Atari 8-bit family and Commodore 64 programmed by Paul Woakes for Novagen Software. It was published by Novagen in the UK and Europe and by Synapse in North America. The gameplay is similar to that of Atari, Inc.'s 1980 arcade game Battlezone, but with large, sometimes screen-filling, scaled bitmaps instead of wireframe models.

Versions for the Amiga and Atari ST computers followed much later, in 1991. It was also re-released by Atlantis Software for the Atari 8-bit and Commodore 64 as a cassette budget title.

Gameplay

Encounter contains eight environments with three difficulty levels and includes 3-D graphics and sound effects to indicate the approach of enemy kamikaze aliens. The game contains two level types: a shooting level where alien saucers and drones attack the player in a 3-D plane with regularly placed columns and a flying level where the player must navigate a 3-D star field by avoiding contact with any foreign objects. The level type alternates as players advance by entering vortexes which appear after each level is completed. Game control was with the then-standard eight-way digital joystick.

Development
Encounter was the very first game written by Paul Woakes. With his own company Novagen Software not founded yet, he was looking for a publisher. In 1983, he called Bruce Jordan who was owner of the Birmingham Atari Centre and asked him he would be interested in helping him publish Encounter. Bruce Jordan agreed and Novagen Software was formed (initially as Paul Woakes's own company and Bruce Jordan's company was engaged on a 'percentage' for publication, sales and distribution on Novagen's behalf). Encounter was released early 1984, and it did sell well, with the Atari version charted higher and longer than the Commodore 64 version, although C64 did extremely well in Germany.

Reception

Your Commodore gave the game four out of five stars praising the game's level of difficulty and available environments along with appreciating the sound effects which indicate when difficult enemies are going to attack. In 1991, the game was converted to the Amiga. However, the gameplay was outdated, and Amiga Joker gave it a mediocre score of 57%, stating that it was good enough for a short play from time to time.

In a retrospective review in Retro Gamer the game was praised as a "technical marvel" which runs at an impressive speed and presents a realistic environment.

References

External links

1983 video games
Amiga games
Atari 8-bit family games
Atari ST games
Commodore 64 games
First-person shooters
Novagen Software games
Synapse Software games
Video games developed in the United Kingdom
Atlantis Software games